The UK music charts are a collection of charts that reflect the music-buying habits of people within the United Kingdom. Most of them are produced by the Official Charts Company.

Main charts

Further genre, format and regional charts are produced by OCC and other compilers.

Classic FM introduced a classical music chart and the annual Classic FM Hall of Fame. In response, BBC Radio 3 introduced a specialist classical chart that lists only "serious" classics, and devoted some of its Tuesday morning programming to this chart.

References

British record charts